The Here We Go Again Tour was the seventh solo concert tour by American singer-actress Cher in support of her twenty-sixth studio album Dancing Queen. This was the first time the singer had embarked on a world tour since her Living Proof: The Farewell Tour (2002–2005). The tour started on September 21, 2018, and was forced to conclude on March 10, 2020 due to the COVID-19 pandemic.

Background
On May 7, 2018, it was announced via various media outlets that Cher would embark on her first Australian solo tour in more than a decade and her seventh solo concert tour overall. On May 17, 2018, it was announced that Cher would add two more dates in Melbourne and Sydney due to "overwhelming demand". On June 27, 2018, it was announced that Cher will visit New Zealand  for a concert before continuing the tour in Australia. A second concert in New Zealand was announced shortly after. On September 3, 2018, it was announced that Cher would "farewell Melbourne" for a "third and final show" on October 6, 2018, due to high demand. Later that same week, it was announced that Cher will take the Here We Go Again Tour to North America for 34 dates. The second leg of the tour started on January 17, 2019 in Florida and ended on May 30, 2019, in Vancouver.

On December 11, 2018, it was announced that Cher would tour Europe for the first time in 15 years. The European leg of the tour started on September 26, 2019 in Berlin, Germany and finished on November 3, 2019 in Belfast, Northern Ireland.
Following this, Cher announced new tour dates in North America, beginning in Portland, Oregon on November 19, 2019. On March 12, 2020, Cher announced her spring tour dates would be postponed to the fall, amid the ongoing coronavirus pandemic, with the exception of Birmingham, Alabama, which was cancelled, due to planned renovations at the Legacy Arena during the rescheduled run. However, due to the persistence of the pandemic in the United States, the rescheduled dates were all canceled.

Concert synopsis
A giant curtain is set up where, during the start of the concert, a video montage featuring many moments of Cher's career is projected onto it. After the intro ends and the curtain drops, Cher appears wearing a purple toga and a blue wig, while standing on a bedazzled arched lift performing "Woman's World". The song is followed by "Strong Enough" and a 15-minute  on stage monologue where she infamously asks the crowd "what's your granny doing tonight?"  She leaves for a costume change, while the "Gayatri Mantra" is played. She returns on a mechanical elephant lip syncing the last part, and then she gets off the elephant and she performs "All or Nothing". The next act is started with a video interlude of Cher and her late ex-husband, Sonny Bono, singing a medley of "Little Man" and "All I Ever Need is You". She starts performing "The Beat Goes On" followed by a brief speech where Cher talks about how she rarely performs the song "I Got You Babe" live with Bono joining her via a large-screen video monitor.
A video interlude of Cher performing "You Haven't Seen the Last of Me" follows and the next act starts with her dancers performing a Burlesque-inspired dance routine. Finally, Cher enters the stage in a Burlesque inspired outfit and sings "Welcome to Burlesque", followed by a costume change, with "Lie to Me" acrobatic interlude. She and her dancers reappear in 70's inspired clothes as she sings her covers of ABBA's "Waterloo" and "SOS". Cher then goes to an elevated platform and sings "Fernando", accompanied by a backdrop of fireworks.

After a video montage of her career highlights as an actress, the next act sees Cher performing "After All". An interlude of "Heartbreak Hotel" plays as Cher changes costumes and sings "Walking In Memphis", which she dedicated to the first time she saw Elvis in concert. "The Shoop Shoop Song (It's in His Kiss)" ends the act, and a guitar solo of "Bang Bang (My Baby Shot Me Down)" plays as a final intermission. Cher, in a black see-through bodysuit, appears to close the main set with performances of "I Found Someone" and "If I Could Turn Back Time". She leaves, and after a minute, returns to close the show with an encore performance of "Believe".

Commercial reception
Cher, with the Here We Go Again Tour, was the third top-grossing female touring artist of 2019 and ranked at number 11 on Billboard's Year End Top 40 Tours. Pollstar's Year End Top 100 Tours chart ranked Cher at number 20. In 2019, Cher became the first female artist in history with the age of over 70 to gross over $100 million in one concert tour.

Critical reception
The tour has received mostly positive reception from critics, praising Cher's vocals as well as the elements of the show and the costume changes. The European leg of the tour gained critical acclaim praising Cher's energy, performances, and humor. The tour was nominated for a People's Choice Award in the “Favorite Concert Tour of 2019” category.

Set list
The following set list is from the concert on January 17 in Estero, Florida. It does not represent all shows.

 "Woman's World"
 "Strong Enough"
 "Gayatri Mantra" 
 "All or Nothing"
 "All I Ever Need Is You" / "Little Man" 
 "The Beat Goes On"
 "I Got You Babe"
 "You Haven't Seen the Last of Me" 
 "Welcome to Burlesque"
 "Lie To Me"
 "Waterloo"
 "SOS"
 "Fernando"
 "After All"
 "Heartbreak Hotel" 
 "Walking in Memphis"
 "The Shoop Shoop Song (It's in His Kiss)"
 "Bang Bang" 
 "I Found Someone"
 "If I Could Turn Back Time"
Encore
 "Believe"

Shows

Cancelled shows

Notes

Personnel
Adapted from the Here We Go Again Tour program credits.

 Cher – lead vocals
 Nick Cua – tour director
 Ollie Marland – musical director
 Bob Mackie – costume designer

Band
 Ollie Marland and Darrell Smith – keyboards
  Joel Hoekstra / Ben Mauro  – guitar
  Ashley Reeves – Bass
  Jason Sutter – drums
 Jodi Katz – background vocals
 Nikki Tillman – background vocals
 Jenny Douglas-Foote – background vocals
Dancers
 Ferly Prado – dancer
 Marlon Pelayo – dancer
 Daniel Dory – dancer
 Melanie Lewis-Yribar – dancer
 Jamal Story – dancer
 Ben Bigler – dancer
 Britta Grant – dancer
 Bailey Swift – dancer
 Sumayah McRae – dancer
 SheilaJoy Burford – dancer
 Dujuan Smart Jr. – dancer
 Ryan Ramírez- dancer

References

2018 concert tours
2019 concert tours
2020 concert tours
Cher concert tours
Concert tours of Australia
Concert tours postponed due to the COVID-19 pandemic